The  were a group of man-made diseases all caused by environmental pollution due to improper handling of industrial wastes by Japanese corporations. The first occurred in 1912, and the other three occurred in the 1950s and 1960s.

Despite the moniker of 'four' becoming the prominent way to refer to the events, Minamata disease and Niigata Minamata disease were the same pollution disease spread by the same poison, just in different locations.

Due to lawsuits, publicity, and other actions against the corporations responsible for the pollution, as well as the creation of the Environmental Agency in 1971, increased public awareness, and changes in industrial practices, the incidence of these kinds of diseases declined after the 1970s. These cases also set precedents for private tort law and civil law in issues of compensation for technology-related mass damage which continue to have repercussions in legal cases in Japan today.

Itai-itai disease 
Itai-itai disease first occurred in 1912 within Toyama Prefecture. This disease was given the name "itai-itai" because this was the phrase affected people would frequently cry out; it translates into "it-hurts it-hurts disease".

Cause of itai-itai 
The cause of itai-itai disease was determined to be cadmium poisoning in the drinking water from the Jinzū River basin. The source of cadmium was discovered to be from Mitsui Mining and Smelting Company. Mitsui Mining began to discharge cadmium into the Jinzū River in 1910. The cadmium poisoned the river, thus poisoning locals' source of water. Any person who drank that water or ate food that was grown with the contaminated water, such as rice, would be likely to show signs of itai-itai disease.

Symptoms of itai-itai 
The first symptoms were spine and leg pain. However, as the disease progresses symptoms include:
debilitating pain
bone fractures from mild traumas or activities (e.g., coughing or walking)
skeletal deformities
anemia
kidney disorders

Aftermath of itai-itai 
Most people with itai-itai disease were confined to bed because walking caused severe pain. Residents of the surrounding area that were harmed by this disease filed a lawsuit against Mitsui Mining & Smelting Company in 1968. Residents won this lawsuit and began to conduct negotiations. Mitsui Mining formally admitted that itai-itai disease was caused by their discharge of cadmium into the Jinzū River. Mitsui Mining was also obliged to pay recovery costs for the land. This meant that they had to ensure the poisoned land was returned to a safe and cultivable state.

Minamata disease 
The first report of Minamata disease originated in Minamata in Kumamoto Prefecture in the year 1956. Many of the earliest patients became insane from the symptoms and in some cases died within a month of being affected. After an extensive investigation, the Minamata disease was identified as a heavy metal poisoning, specifically methylmercury poisoning, transmitted by the ingestion of contaminated fish from Minamata Bay.  The methylmercury inside the contaminated fish attacked the affected patient's central nervous system, which caused a variety of symptoms.

Symptoms of Minamata disease
numbing in the arms and legs
impairment of balance
fatigue
ringing in the ears
tunnel vision
loss of hearing
decrease in communication skills (slurred speech)
Most patients exhibited combinations of symptoms and did not show all symptoms.

Chisso Corporation 
The cause of this contamination in Minamata bay was then traced back to Chisso Corporation's dumping of methylmercury into Minamata Bay. Chisso Corporation produced acetaldehyde using water, acetylene, mercury(II) sulfate as a catalyst and manganese dioxide or since August 1951, ferric sulfide as a co-catalyst. Acetaldehyde reacts with acetic anhydride in order to produce ethylidene diacetate, which is heated to produce vinyl acetate. Acetaldehyde was also used to produce acetic acid by oxidizing acetaldehyde and vinyl chloride, 
which is polymerized to make PVC; however, the use of ferric sulfide had a downside: methylmercury (or organic mercury) was a by-product in the making of these chemicals due to its use. The methylmercury was then dumped into Minamata Bay as chemical waste. Chisso decided not to stop the use of the mentioned catalysts or the dumping of their byproducts into the bay until 1966. Today, Chisso makes compensation payments to all certified (recognized) patients of Minamata disease. Over 50 hectares of the bay were reclaimed, using the contaminated sludge from the bottom of the bay with a non-contaminated layer of soil on top.

Aftermath of Minamata disease 
In 1970, the Japanese Water Pollution Control Act, which states that all factories are required by law to regulate disposal of dangerous chemicals, was enacted. In 1977, the Japanese government took on the task of cleaning Minamata Bay by vacuuming out 1.5 million cubic metres of methylmercury-contaminated sludge from the bottom of the bay and using them to reclaim over 50 hectares of the bay along with non-contaminated soil on top. Then in 1997, after fourteen years and $359 million, the Governor of Kumamoto Prefecture deemed Minamata Bay safe.

Niigata Minamata disease 
In 1965, a number of patients in Niigata Prefecture exhibited signs of Minamata disease. Niigata Minamata was caused by methylmercury poisoning in the Agano River basin. However, this second outbreak of Minamata disease was discovered early on. The degree of this outbreak was minimal compared to that of the first Minamata disease that took place in Kumamoto prefecture. Investigation of the cause of the disease was given to the Niigata University medical department. There were a number of factors that could be the cause of this outbreak. Along the Agano River basin there were several plants that used mercury in production, agricultural chemicals were widely used in the area, and the last possible cause of the outbreak was said to be the cause of an earthquake that took place a year before the disease was discovered in Niigata.

Symptoms of Niigata Minamata disease 
As the name implies, Niigata Minamata disease is similar to Minamata disease; they both share the similar symptoms:
 numbness in the arms and legs
 impairment of balance
 fatigue
 ringing in the ears
 tunnel vision
 loss of hearing
 decrease in communication skills

Showa Denko 
In the spring of 1966, the research team determined the most likely cause to the dumping of methylmercury from Showa Denko Corporation factory.  Showa Denko was located upstream on the Agano River and, just like the Chisso corporation, produced methylmercury as a by-product and then dumped it into the Agano river. Much like Chisso corporation, Showa Denko declined all charges that they were at fault for the Niigata Minamata outbreak.

Aftermath of Niigata Minamata disease 
After much controversy, Showa Denko was found guilty of negligence and was then forced to pay compensation payments to all those affected by  Niigata Minamata disease. In the year that Niigata Minamata was discovered, 26 people were designated disease patients, and five died as a result of the methylmercury poisoning.

Yokkaichi asthma
Yokkaichi is a city in the center of Japan in Mie Prefecture; known as the "town of petroleum" as it produces almost a quarter of the total petroleum in Japan. Construction of the first oil refinery in this area first began in 1955  and after construction many respiratory diseases emerged within the city and among neighboring districts.

Cause of Yokkaichi asthma 
In the middle of this city was the largest heavy oil-fired power station and refinery in Japan during this time period. Unfortunately, this refinery was not equipped with machines that could lower sulfur dioxide emissions before releasing them into the air. In the early 1960s, respiratory diseases began to emerge in the general population of Yokkaichi and even in some neighboring districts. This increase in respiratory problems was then specified as Yokkaichi asthma. This form of asthma was prevalent within Yokkaichi—5–10% of inhabitants aged 40 in Yokkaichi were reported to have chronic bronchitis, whereas less than 3% had the same disease in non-polluted areas.

Yokkaichi asthma relief system 
To offer support for many of the people affected by disease, a public release system for air pollution was established in 1965. This set forth that all people in the Yokkaichi area who met the following criteria were paid by the program:
Specific diseases such as bronchial  asthma, chronic  bronchitis, pulmonary emphysema, and their complications.
In specific areas where the prevalence of that disease has increased.
Three years of residence within the specified area.
Today, there are many laws regulating the amount of sulfur dioxide a factory can release into the air. These laws help keep the disaster of Yokkaichi Asthma from happening once again within Japan's borders.

See also
Environmental issues in Japan
Nitrogen oxide
Toroku arsenic disease
Yushō disease
An-naka zinc refinery and cadmium pollution, Japan

References

Environmental disasters in Japan
Health in Japan
Pollution in Japan

Mass poisoning
Water pollution in Japan
Corporate scandals